Athrips stepposa is a moth of the family Gelechiidae. It is found in Ukraine, Russia (southern Ural and Siberia: Tuva), north-western Kazakhstan and Kyrgyzstan.

The wingspan is 8.5–10 mm. The forewings are greyish brown with two black spots at the base and about one-third, and one black spot at two-thirds near the posterior margin. All spots are surrounded by broad rings of ochreous scales. The hindwings are grey. Adults are on wing from mid-May to mid-June and again from July to early August in two generations per year.

The larvae feed on Caragana frutex.

References

Moths described in 2005
Athrips
Moths of Europe
Moths of Asia